Robert Lowry may refer to:

 Robert Lowry (governor) (1829–1910), American politician, governor of Mississippi
 Robert Lowry (hymn writer) (1826–1899), American professor of literature, Baptist minister and composer of gospel hymns
 Robert Lowry (Indiana politician) (1824–1904), American politician, U.S. Representative from Indiana
 Robert Lowry (writer) (1919–1994), American novelist, short story writer and independent press publisher
 Robert Lowry, Baron Lowry (1919–1999), Lord Chief Justice of Northern Ireland and a Lord of Appeal in Ordinary
 Robert Lowry (Royal Navy officer) (1854–1920), British admiral
 Robert William Lowry (1912–1963), New Zealand printer
 Robert William Lowry (British Army officer) (1824–1905)